Xiaopin can refer to:

Sketch comedy in Chinese
Xiaopin (literary genre), a form of short essay popular in the sixteenth and seventeenth centuries.
Notebook style essay
 - A book published in the late Ming era.

Bagatelle (music)
Grammatical particle

See also

 Xiao (disambiguation)
 Pin (disambiguation)
 Xiaopeng (disambiguation)
 Xiaoping (disambiguation)